Apodemia walkeri, commonly known as Walker's metalmark, is a species of butterfly in the family Riodinidae (metalmarks), in the superfamily Papilionoidea (butterflies and skippers). The species was described by Frederick DuCane Godman and Osbert Salvin in 1886. It is found from north-western Costa Rica north through Mexico. It is an occasional visitor to the lower Rio Grande Valley in southern Texas. The habitat consists of subtropical scrubs and forests.

References

Further reading
 Pelham, Jonathan P. (2008). "A catalogue of the butterflies of the United States and Canada with a complete bibliography of the descriptive and systematic literature". Journal of Research on the Lepidoptera, vol. 40, xiv + 658.
 Arnett, Ross H. (2000). American Insects: A Handbook of the Insects of America North of Mexico. CRC Press.

External links
Butterflies and Moths of North America

Riodinidae
Butterflies described in 1886
Taxa named by Frederick DuCane Godman
Taxa named by Osbert Salvin